The Horten H.IX, RLM designation Ho 229 (or Gotha Go 229 for extensive re-design work done by Gotha to prepare the aircraft for mass production) was a German prototype fighter/bomber initially designed by Reimar and Walter Horten to be built by Gothaer Waggonfabrik. Developed at a late stage of the Second World War, it was the first flying wing to be powered by jet engines.

Only jet propulsion was capable of achieving the required speed, but such engines were relatively primitive and extremely fuel-hungry, necessitating considerable effort across the rest of the design in order to satisfy the range requirement as well. The flying wing configuration was favoured by the Horten brothers due to its high aerodynamic efficiency, as had been demonstrated by the Horten H.IV glider. In order to minimise drag, the Ho 229 was not fitted with any extraneous flight control surfaces. The Ho 229 was the only design that even came close to the requirements set out, and the Horten brothers quickly received an initial order for three prototypes after the project garnered Göring's approval.

Due to the Horten brothers lacking appropriate production facilities, the Ho 229's manufacturing was contracted out to Gothaer Waggonfabrik; however, the company allegedly undermined the project and sought to have Air Ministry officials favour its own flying wing designs instead. On 1 March 1944, the first prototype H.IX V1, an unpowered glider, performed its maiden flight; it was followed by the H.IX V2, powered by Junkers Jumo 004 turbojet engines, in December 1944. However, on 18 February 1945 the V2 was destroyed in a fatal crash, killing its test pilot. Despite as many as 100 production aircraft being ordered, none were ever completed; the near-complete H.IX V3 prototype was amongst the items captured by the American military and transferred back to the United States under Operation Paperclip. It was evaluated by both British and American researchers before entering long term storage; it is presently on static display in the Smithsonian National Air and Space Museum.

Design and development

During the early 1930s, the Horten brothers had become interested in the flying wing configuration as a method of improving the performance of gliders. At that time, the German government had been actively funding glider clubs across the country as a response to the production of military and even motorized aircraft being forbidden by the Treaty of Versailles after the First World War. The flying wing layout removed the need for a tail and associated control surfaces and theoretically offered the lowest possible weight, using wings that were relatively short and sturdy, and without the added drag of the fuselage. Their first aircraft of such a configuration was the Horten H.IV.

Conventional German bombers were capable of reaching Allied targets across Great Britain, but were suffering devastating losses from Allied fighters in the process. At the time, there was no conventional means for aircraft designers to meet these goals—the new Junkers Jumo 004B turbojets could provide the required speed, but had excessive fuel consumption. However, the Horten brothers concluded that the low-drag flying wing design could meet all of the goals: by reducing the drag, cruise power could be lowered to the point where the range requirement could be met. They put forward their private project, the H.IX, as the basis for the bomber.

The Government Air Ministry (Reichsluftfahrtministerium) quickly approved the Horten proposal, but ordered the addition of two 30 mm cannons, as they felt the aircraft would also be useful as a fighter due to its estimated top speed being significantly higher than that of any Allied aircraft. German officials assigned the designation Ho 229 to the aircraft. Göring was reportedly impressed with the design and personally intervened to ensure that three prototypes were ordered at a cost of 500,000 ℛℳ. At one point, the Air Ministry issued an order for 100 production aircraft, although this was subsequently curtailed to only 20 aircraft. Furthermore, as the Horten brothers lacked appropriate production facilities, it was decided that the manufacturing of the aircraft would be handled by an established company, Gothaer Waggonfabrik. This arrangement was somewhat complicated by Gothaer's alleged efforts to persuade German authorities to favour its own projects, which included flying wing designs, over the Ho 229.

Observing the difficulties present in the Ho 229's design and development, Russell Lee, the chair of the Aeronautics Department at the National Air and Space Museum, speculated that an important motivating factor of the project for the Horten brothers was to prevent them and their workers from being assigned to more dangerous roles by the German military. Looking beyond the Ho 229, the Horten brothers produced numerous flying wing designs, such as the Horten H.VII fighter-trainer and the Horten H.XVIII Amerikabomber. According to the aviation historian Jean-Denis G.G. LePage, various other wartime projects were inspired by the Horten brother's work.

The H.IX was of mixed construction; while the center pod was made from welded steel tubing, the wing spars was composed of pine. The wings were made up of a pair of thin plywood panels that were glued together with a charcoal and sawdust mixture. The exterior was covered by a fireproof paint. The wing had a single main spar, penetrated by the jet engine inlets, and a secondary spar used for attaching the elevons. It was designed with a 7g load factor and a 1.8× safety rating; therefore, the aircraft had a 12.6g ultimate load rating. The wing's chord/thickness ratio ranged from 15% at the root to 8% at the wingtips. There was relatively little available interior space, making the addition of new equipment or more crew members either difficult or impossible.

The aircraft was fitted with retractable tricycle landing gear, with the nosegear on the first two prototypes sourced from a He 177's tailwheel system, with the third prototype using an He 177A main gear wheelrim and tire on its custom-designed nosegear strutwork and wheel fork. A drogue parachute slowed the aircraft upon landing. The pilot sat on a primitive ejection seat. A special pressure suit was developed by Dräger. While the aircraft had originally been designed to be powered by the BMW 003 turbojet engine, this engine was not quite ready at the time, thus the Junkers Jumo 004 engine was substituted. Flight control was achieved via a combination of elevons and spoilers. This control system included both long-span (inboard) and short-span (outboard) spoilers, with the smaller outboard spoilers activated first; it reported provided a smoother and more graceful control of yaw than would have been by a single-spoiler system.

Operational history

Testing and evaluation

On 1 March 1944, the first prototype H.IX V1, an unpowered glider with fixed tricycle landing gear, performed its maiden flight. Flight results were very favorable, but there was an accident when the pilot attempted to land without first retracting an instrument-carrying pole extending from the aircraft. Following the transference of design responsibility from the Horten brothers to Gothaer Waggonfabrik, the company's design team implemented several changes: they added a simple ejection seat, substantially redesigned the undercarriage to enable a higher gross weight, changed the jet engine inlets, and added ducting to air-cool the jet engine's outer casing to prevent damage to the wooden wing.

The H.IX V1 was followed in December 1944 by the Junkers Jumo 004-powered second prototype H.IX V2; the BMW 003 engine had been preferred but was not available in sufficient quantity. Göring believed in the design and ordered a production series of 40 aircraft from Gothaer Waggonfabrik with the RLM designation Ho 229, even though it had not yet taken to the air under jet power. On 2 February 1945, the first flight of the H.IX V2 was conducted at Oranienburg. The Horten brothers were unable to witness this flight as they were occupied with producing the design for a new turbojet-powered strategic bomber in response to the Amerikabomber competition. All of the subsequent test flights and development were conducted by Gothaer Waggonfabrik. The test pilot was Leutnant Erwin Ziller. Two further test flights were performed: on 2 February 1945 and on 18 February 1945. 

Two weeks later, on 18 February 1945, disaster struck during the third test flight. Ziller took off without any problems to perform a series of flight tests. After about 45 minutes, at an altitude of around 800 m, one of the Jumo 004 turbojet engines developed a problem, caught fire and stopped. Ziller was seen to put the aircraft into a dive and pull up several times in an attempt to restart the engine and save the precious prototype. Ziller undertook a series of four complete turns at 20° angle of bank. Ziller did not use his radio or eject from the aircraft. He may already have been unconscious as a result of the fumes from the burning engine. The aircraft crashed just outside the boundary of the airfield; Ziller was thrown from the aircraft on impact and died from his injuries two weeks later. The prototype aircraft was completely destroyed.

Despite this setback, the project continued with sustained energy. On 12 March 1945, nearly a week after the U.S. Army had launched Operation Lumberjack to cross the Rhine River, the Ho 229 was included in the Jäger-Notprogramm (Emergency Fighter Program) for accelerated production of inexpensive "wonder weapons". The prototype workshop was moved to the Gothaer Waggonfabrik (Gotha) in Friedrichroda, western Thuringia. In the same month, work commenced on the third prototype, the Ho 229 V3.

The V3 was larger than previous prototypes, the shape being modified in various areas, and it was meant to be a template for the pre-production series Ho 229 A-0 day fighters, of which 20 machines had been ordered. The V3 was meant to be powered by two Jumo 004C engines, with 10% greater thrust each than the earlier Jumo 004B production engine used for the Me 262A and Ar 234B, and could carry two MK 108 30 mm cannons in the wing roots. Work had also started on the two-seat Ho 229 V4 and Ho 229 V5 night-fighter prototypes, the Ho 229 V6 armament test prototype, and the Ho 229 V7 two-seat trainer.

In April 1945, George Patton’s Third Army found four steel-and-wood Horten prototypes; a Horten glider and the Ho 229 V3, which was undergoing final assembly, were captured. Of three airframes, the V3 was nearest to completion, and was shipped to the United States for evaluation. Along the way, the Ho 229 spent a brief time at RAE Farnborough in the UK, during which it was evaluated as to whether British jet engines could be installed, but the mountings were found to be incompatible with the early British turbojets, which used larger-diameter centrifugal compressors as opposed to the slimmer axial-flow turbojets the Germans had developed. The Americans were just starting to create their own axial-compressor turbojets before the conflict's end, such as the Westinghouse J30, with a thrust level only approaching the BMW 003A's full output. It is uncertain if the aircraft's original Junkers-supplied engines were ever ran, although the American evaluation team at one point had the intention of flying it.

Surviving aircraft
The only surviving Ho 229 airframe, the V3—and the only surviving Second World War-era German jet prototype still in existence—has been at the Smithsonian National Air and Space Museum's Paul E. Garber Restoration Facility in Suitland, Maryland, U.S. In December 2011, the National Air and Space Museum moved the Ho 229 into the active restoration area of the Garber Restoration Facility, where it was reviewed for full restoration and display. The central section of the V3 prototype was meant to be moved to the Smithsonian NASM's Steven F. Udvar-Hazy Center in late 2012 to commence a detailed examination of it before starting any serious conservation/restoration efforts and has been cleared for the move to the Udvar-Hazy facility's restoration shops as of summer 2014, with only the NASM's B-26B Marauder Flak Bait medium bomber ahead of it for restoration, within the Udvar-Hazy facility's Mary Baker Engen Restoration Hangar. As of early 2018, the surviving Horten Ho 229 has been moved to display in the main hall, alongside other WWII-era German aircraft.

Claimed stealth technology

Radar absorbent material

In 1983, Reimar Horten stated that he intended to mix charcoal dust in with the wood glue to absorb electromagnetic waves (radar), which he believed could shield the aircraft from detection by the British early-warning ground-based radar that operated at 20 to 30 MHz (10 to 15m wavelength), top end of the HF band, known as Chain Home. This charcoal glue treatment was planned for the never-made production model; however, it remained unclear if the V3 prototype had benefited from a preliminary iteration of this technology.

During 2008, a team of engineers from Northrop Grumman undertook electromagnetic tests on the V3's multilayer wooden centre-section nose cones. They tested over a frequency range of 12 to 117 THz, with wavelengths of the order of 10 microns. The team observed that the "Ho 229 leading edge has the same characteristics as the plywood [of the control sample] except that the frequency [do not exactly match] and have a shorter bandwidth." The team, who had assumed the presence of carbon black from visual inspection, went on to conclude that the "similarity of the two tests indicates that the design using the carbon black type material produced a poor absorber." The Smithsonian Institution has since performed a technical study of the materials used on the prototype and determined that there is "no evidence of carbon black or charcoal", thus invalidating the proposed presence of carbon black to explain the slightly different absorbent property of the prototype wood compared to the control sample of plywood used in the Northrop Grumman testing.

Radar cross section and shape

A jet-powered flying wing design such as the Horten Ho 229 has a smaller radar cross-section (RCS) than conventional contemporary twin-engine aircraft because the wings blended into the fuselage and there are no large propeller disks or vertical and horizontal tail surfaces to provide a typical identifiable radar signature.

In early 2008, Northrop Grumman paired up television documentary producer Michael Jorgensen and the National Geographic Channel to produce a documentary to determine whether the Ho 229 was the world's first true "stealth" fighter-bomber. Northrop Grumman built a full-size non-flying reproduction of the V3, primarily made out of wood, unlike the original aircraft, which had an extensive steel space-frame to which the wooden skin was bolted.

This implies a frontal RCS of only 40% that of a Bf 109 at the Chain Home frequencies.
The US magazine Aviation Week & Space Technology published summaries about stealth technology; some reports indicate the Horten Ho-IX/ Gotha Go-229 returned radar echo just from the annular air entries to turbines, the nose and canopy, and the wing track binding the inner part of turbine intake to cabin.

Variants

H.IX V1
First prototype, an unpowered glider, one built and flown (three-view drawing below).
H.IX V2
First powered prototype, one built and flown with twin Junkers Jumo 004B engines.

Gotha developments:
Ho 229 V3
Revised air intakes, engines moved forward to correct longitudinal imbalance. Its nearly completed airframe was captured in production, with two Junkers Jumo 004B jet engines installed in the airframe.
Ho 229 V4
Planned two-seat all-weather fighter, in construction at Friedrichroda, but not much more than the center-section's tubular framework completed.
Ho 229 V5
Planned two-seat all-weather fighter, in construction at Friedrichroda, but not much more than the center-section's tubular framework completed.
Ho 229 V6
Projected definitive single-seat fighter version with different cannon, one captured in production at Ilmenau by US troops.

Horten developments:
H.IXb (also designated V6 and V7 by the Hortens)
Projected two-seat trainer or night-fighter; not built.

Ho 229 A-0
Projected expedited production version based on Ho 229 V6; not built.

Specifications (Horten H.IX V2)

See also

Notes

References

Citations

Bibliography

Further reading

External links

 National Air & Space Museum's Ho 229 V3 Restoration Project Homepage
 Horten Nurflügels
 Arthur Bentley's scale drawings of the Ho-229
 Construction of a model of the Horten IX including CAD files (in German)
 "Horten: Two brothers, one wing"
 The German Army Horten Ho-229
 WarHistoryOnline's June 2020-dated Ho 229 V3 restoration photos article
 The Horten flying wing on YouTube

Stealth aircraft
Flying wings
1940s German fighter aircraft
Ho 229, Horten
229
World War II jet aircraft of Germany
Twinjets
German inventions
German inventions of the Nazi period
Aircraft first flown in 1944
1944 in Germany